A. Jack Thomas was a Baltimore-area conductor, hired to work with the city's municipal music performance groups. He had also been one of the first African American bandleaders in the Army, and was director of the music department at Morgan College. He also founded the Aeolian Conservatory of Music in Baltimore.

Thomas later became the first African American to conduct the Baltimore Symphony Orchestra.

References

Sources

20th-century American conductors (music)
American male conductors (music)
Year of birth missing
Year of death missing
African-American conductors (music)
20th-century American male musicians
Morgan State University faculty
20th-century African-American musicians